Tawaif is an 1985 Indian drama movie. It was produced by R. C. Kumar and directed by B. R. Chopra. It stars Rishi Kapoor, Rati Agnihotri, Poonam Dhillon, Deepak Parashar in lead roles, with Ashok Kumar, Kader Khan, Asrani, Iftekhar, Shashikala, Sushma Seth in other important roles.

Plot
The story is set around a Tawaif (courtesan or someone who willingly or otherwise adopts the profession of entertaining others for a living), Sultana, who accidentally enters the life of Dawood Mohammed Ali Khan Yusaf Zahi. Dawood has already fallen in love with writer Kaynat Mirza. Dawood finds himself in a situation such that he has to claim that Sultana is his wife. Sultana soon makes room in everybody's heart with her softness and intelligence, love, affection and playfulness. Dawood's life takes a turn when he acknowledges that he cannot forget his first love Kaynat, but neither can he subdue his new, burgeoning feelings for Sultana, whose true identity he cannot reveal to anybody without dire consequences both for himself and for her.

In the end, Dawood accepts he has fallen in love with Sultana, while Sulaiman, who has always cared deeply for Kaynat, confesses his love to her.

Cast
 Ashok Kumar as Mr. Nigam
 Rishi Kapoor as Dawood Mohammed Ali Khan Yusuf Zahi
 Rati Agnihotri as Sultana 
 Poonam Dhillon as Kaynat Mirza
 Deepak Parashar as Sulaiman
 Kader Khan as Rahim Shaikh
 Asrani as Constable Pandya
 Iftekhar as Lala Fakirchand
 Shashikala as Bilquis Bai
 Sushma Seth as Ameena Bai

Soundtrack
The music for all the songs were composed by Ravi and penned by Hasan Kamaal.

Awards

 33rd Filmfare Awards:

Won

 Best Story – Dr. Aleem Masroor
 Best Dialogue – Rahi Masoom Raza

Nominated

 Best Film – R. C. Kumar
 Best Actor – Rishi Kapoor
 Best Actress – Rati Agnihotri
 Best Supporting Actress – Sushma Seth
 Best Lyricist – Hasan Kamal for "Bohot Der Se"

References

External links 
 

1980s Hindi-language films
1980s Urdu-language films
1985 films
Films about courtesans in India
Films directed by B. R. Chopra
Films scored by Ravi
Urdu-language Indian films